The John B. Lacson Foundation Maritime University (JBLFMU) is the first maritime institution in the Philippines to obtain the accreditation of DNV (Det Norske Veritas).

It consist of four major academic components by the John B. Lacson Foundation, Inc. System; the JBLFMU-Arevalo, JBLCF-Bacolod, JBLFMU-Molo, and JBLF-Training Center.

It is the first maritime institution to earn the Philippine Association of Colleges and Universities Commission on Accreditation (PACUCOA) Level IV re-accredited status. It is also the first to establish a maritime high school in the Philippines; the first to publish a maritime education review; the first to be granted the Expanded Tertiary Education Equivalency Program (ETEEAP) for Maritime Education in the country; and the first maritime university in the Philippines to become a member of the esteemed International Association of Maritime Universities (IAMU). It has also gained the international accreditation, ISO 9001 Bureau Veritas Certification.

History
The John B. Lacson Foundation Maritime University was founded by Capt. Juan Bautista Lacson, graduated from Philippine Nautical School (presently the Philippine Merchant Marine Academy) class of 1920, a talented and hard working master mariner in his time.  It first started with a review school for marine officers in May 1931 before the establishment of the Iloilo Maritime Academy in 1948.

When it first opened with 60 enrollees, the Academy offered a two-year regular course for cadets in the nautical profession leading to the acquisition of a Third Mate license for merchant marine officers as well as reserved naval officers in the Philippine Navy. By the time it was granted permit to operate in 1949, the school had 150 junior students and 54 seniors.

The following year, it was granted government recognition and registered as a non-stock corporation by the Securities and Exchange Commission. To accommodate its growing population, the Academy transferred locations a couple of times before settling along Muelle Loney Street, Iloilo City in 1953. The height of activism, strikes, pickets and labor unrest in the country in 1971 did not spare the Iloilo Maritime Academy from the fury of the times.

In 1972, there was a change in leadership of the institution in the person of the Capt. Lacson’s youngest daughter, Mary Lou Lacson, who was welcomed and accepted even by union members. It was this year that marked the beginning of the expansion of IMA to JBLCF, i.e., JBLFMU - Arevalo in 1973, JBLCF – Bacolod in 1974, JBLFMU – Molo in 1976, and JBLF – Training Center in 1995. Also, the Puerto del Mar unit in Guimaras was established in 1991.

In 1994, the different units were reorganized into the John B. Lacson Foundation, Inc. System.

Logo
The name John B. Lacson Foundation was adopted in 1985 by the institution to give honor and legacy to its founder, Capt. Juan "John" B. Lacson, when it was converted from a stock corporation to a foundation. In 1985, a contest was conducted among the members of the institution for a new logo due to the conversion of Iloilo Maritime Academy into JBLCF. Midshipman Nelson Reyes of the Marine Engineering Department won the logo making contest. With slight revisions, it was adopted as the official JBLCF logo and later incorporated in the new logo when it was elevated to a university.

Academic programs

Graduate school
JBLFMU's graduate school is located in JBLFMU-Arevalo. All master’s programs are also offered via Distance Education. Extension Class Centers are located in Bacolod City, Davao City, and Mandaluyong.

Maritime High School
In 1990 the university established the first and only maritime high school in the Philippines. Located in JBLFMU-Molo, students are given with basic seamanship subjects and are given a chance to experience life on board a ship through a navigational trip on their 2nd, 3rd, and 4th year in school. Every year, the navigational trips include various places ranging from Manila, Bacolod, Cebu, and Cagayan Oro.

Senior High
JBLFMU-Arevalo, JBLCF-Bacolod, and JBLFMU-Molo are all senior high ready as of 2017.

See also
RRLS ICT Academy

References 
 The Harbor Light, John B. Lacson Foundation System Annual Report A.Y. 2009-2010
 The Harbor Light, John B. Lacson Foundation System 2011 Annual Report

External links
Official Website of the John B. Lacson Foundation Maritime University 

Universities and colleges in Iloilo City